National Tertiary Route 806, or just Route 806 (or ) is a National Road Route of Costa Rica, located in the Limón province.

Description
In Limón province the route covers Siquirres canton (Siquirres, Reventazón districts).

References

Highways in Costa Rica